The 2012 FIM Speedway World Cup Final was the fourth and final race of the 2012 Speedway World Cup season. It was run on July 14 and was won by Denmark from Australia, Russia, and the host nation Sweden. The Final took place at the G&B Stadium in Målilla.

Denmark were led to victory by their captain, Niels K Iversen and Michael Jepsen Jensen, both of whom scored 11 points. They were supported by triple World Champion Nicki Pedersen (9 points) and Mikkel B Jensen (8 points). Australia, led by triple World Champ Jason Crump and 2012 World Champion Chris Holder finished second from Russia who were led by Emil Sayfutdinov who top scored for the meeting with 17 points (Holder was next with 16). Host nation Sweden disappointed on the night to finish fourth and last.

Results

Scores
  39 - Niels K Iversen (C) (11), Michael Jepsen Jensen (11), Nicki Pedersen (9), Mikkel B Jensen (8)
  36 - Jason Crump (C) (10), Darcy Ward (7), Davey Watt (3), Chris Holder (16)
  30 - Roman Povazhny (C) (0), Emil Sayfutdinov (17), Grigory Laguta (8), Artem Laguta (5)
  24 - Andreas Jonsson (C) (11), Fredrik Lindgren (9), Peter Ljung (1), Thomas H. Jonasson (3)

See also
 2012 Speedway World Cup
 motorcycle speedway

References 

Final